The Jan Van Loon House (like van loan) is one of the oldest extant buildings in New York State.  It is located in Athens, New York at 39 South Washington Street (also known as New York State Route 385).  It is inside the Village of Athens Multiple Resource Area (MRA) and the Athens Lower Village Historic District.  It was built by Jan Van Loon, who fathered eight children including Albertus Van Loon. Van Loon was a blacksmith by trade, but was also known to work in silver.

Van Loon was the earliest European settler to the area, purchasing the land in 1685. In 1688 he then gave the settlement its first name, Loonenburg. Only one wall of the original 1706 structure remains unchanged in the house.

Jan's grandchild, John M. Van Loon, sold the family lands on 30 April 1800 to Isaac Northrup, who then developed them into a more complete village.

In 1932, the New York State Education Department placed a historic marker outside the house:

See also
 List of the oldest buildings in New York
 List of New York State Historic Markers in Greene County, New York

References

External link

Houses completed in 1706
Houses in Greene County, New York
1706 establishments in the Province of New York